Stade de l'UQTR is a multi-purpose stadium located on the Université du Québec à Trois-Rivières campus. Stade de l'UQTR is mainly used for track and field events and soccer. In addition to hosting university sports, a major tenant was the Trois-Rivières Attak of the Canadian Soccer League, then the reserve team of the Montreal Impact of the United Soccer Leagues. The stadium features a single grandstand which also has press room.

Sports venues in Trois-Rivières
Soccer venues in Quebec
Multi-purpose stadiums in Quebec
1969 establishments in Quebec
Sports venues completed in 1969